Big Snow may refer to:

Places
 Big Snow Mountain (British Columbia), a summit in the Coast Mountains, Canada
 Big Snow Mountain, King County, State of Washington, USA; a mountain in the Cascades Range
 Dasyueshan ("Big Snow Mountain"), Taiwan; a mountain in the Xueshan Range 
 Hatun Rit'i (Quechua; "Big Snow"), Peru; a mountain in the Andes
 Gogebic Range (Big Snow Country) in Iron County and Gogebic County, Michigan, USA, a region heavily afflicted with lake-effect snowfalls.
 Big Snow Creek (Mississippi), a U.S. creek in Snow Lake Shores, Mississippi
 Big Snow Lake (Mississippi), a U.S. lake in Snow Lake Shores, Mississippi
 Big Snow Lake (Washington), a U.S. lake on Big Snow Mountain; see List of lakes in the Alpine Lakes Wilderness

Facilities and structures
 Big Snow Resort, Bessemer, Michigan, USA; a ski resort, see Comparison of North American ski resorts
 Big Snow American Dream, ('Big Snow' at American Dream Meadowlands), "Big Snow", an indoor ski on snow resort at the "American Dream" shopping mall in East Rutherford, New Jersey, USA.

Climate and weather
 Blizzard, a large, snowy winter storm
 Thundersnow
 Noreaster
 March 1960 nor'easter (aka The Big Snow), a blizzard that stuck New England, USA
 1967 Chicago blizzard (aka The Big Snow of 1967), a blizzard that struck Illinois and Indiana, USA
 A winter with heavy snowfall
 The winter of 1716–1717 in Sutton, Massachusetts, USA; when it was founded; see Benjamin Marsh
 The winters of 1880, 1881, 1893, 1916, in the U.S. state of Washington; see Washington (state)#Climate
 1981–82 United Kingdom cold wave (aka The Big Snow of 1982), a harsh winter in the United Kingdom during December and January.

Literature
 The Big Snow (1949 book) an award-winning illustrated children's story book
 The Big Snow (1962 novel), a western genre fiction novel by Brian Garfield
 Big Snow (2014 book), an award recognized illustrated book under the Charlotte Zolotow Award

Other uses
 The Big Snow (festival), a music festival in the United Kingdom; see Eddy Temple-Morris
 Big Snow (festival), an annual March music festival in Serbia, at the Kopaonik ski resort

See also

 Winter storm
 Northeast Snowfall Impact Scale
 List of Northeast Snowfall Impact Scale winter storms
 Snowstorm (disambiguation)
 Winter storm (disambiguation)